Konstantin Yevgeniyevich Koltsov (born April 17, 1981) is a Belarusian former professional ice hockey player who last played for HC Dinamo Minsk in the Kontinental Hockey League (KHL). He played parts of three seasons with the Pittsburgh Penguins of the National Hockey League between 2002 and 2006. Internationally Koltsov played for the Belarusian national team at the 2002 and 2010 Winter Olympics and at nine World Championships.

Playing career
Koltsov started out playing for Junactva Minsk in the Belarusian 1st division during the 1997–98 season, and moved to Russian Severstal Cherepovets for the next season. Due to his incredible speed and stick handling, he was often referred to as the "Russian Rocket II" due to his similar playing style to that of Russian great Pavel Bure.

He was drafted to the NHL in the 1999 NHL Entry Draft as the Pittsburgh Penguins' first round pick, 18th overall. He played for the Wilkes-Barre/Scranton Penguins in the AHL in the 2002–03 season, and started playing full-time for the Pittsburgh Penguins in the 2003–04 season, playing 82 games and scoring nine goals and twenty assists.

During the NHL lockout, Koltsov played for the Spartak Moscow hockey team.

The following season, Koltsov moved between Wilkes-Barre and Pittsburgh until January where he stayed in the NHL until the end of the season finishing with 3 goals and 6 assists. However, as a result of the Penguins not extending a qualifying offer, Koltsov became an unrestricted free agent on July 1, 2006. In August of that year he returned to Russia, signing a contract to play for Salavat Yulaev Ufa of the Russian Super League.

During the 2007–08 RSL season, Koltsov would be a part of a Salavat Yulaev Ufa squad that would defeat Lokomotiv Yaroslavl to capture the RSL League Title. With the absorption of the RSL into the newly formed Kontinental Hockey League (KHL) at the start of the 2008–09 season, Salavat Yulaev Ufa would become the last standing RSL champion.

On November 27, 2016, Koltsov made his retirement from professional hockey official after competing in 18 seasons.

International play
Koltsov has played on the Belarus national team in the Winter Olympics and IIHF World Championships.

Career statistics

Regular season and playoffs

International

Awards and honours
Kubok Spartaka: 2001
Kubok Presidenta Respubliki Bashkortostan: 2006
Kubok Romazana: 2006
Kubok Polesya: 2007
Russian Super League: 2008

References

External links
 

1981 births
Living people
Ak Bars Kazan players
Atlant Moscow Oblast players
Belarusian ice hockey right wingers
Expatriate ice hockey players in Russia
HC Dinamo Minsk players
Metallurg Novokuznetsk players
Severstal Cherepovets players
HC Spartak Moscow players
National Hockey League first-round draft picks
Ice hockey players at the 2002 Winter Olympics
Ice hockey players at the 2010 Winter Olympics
Olympic ice hockey players of Belarus
Ice hockey people from Minsk
Pittsburgh Penguins draft picks
Pittsburgh Penguins players
Salavat Yulaev Ufa players
Wilkes-Barre/Scranton Penguins players